Jerzy Greszkiewicz (born January 16, 1950) is a Polish sport shooter, who won a bronze medal in the 50 metre Running Target event at the 1976 Summer Olympics in Montreal.

References

1950 births
Olympic shooters of Poland
Shooters at the 1976 Summer Olympics
Shooters at the 1980 Summer Olympics
Shooters at the 1988 Summer Olympics
Olympic bronze medalists for Poland
Olympic medalists in shooting
Medalists at the 1976 Summer Olympics
Living people
Sportspeople from Gdańsk